Flatbush is an American sitcom that aired on CBS for three weeks from February 26, 1979, to March 12, 1979. The original working title was The Flatbush Fungoes.

Plot
The series followed five recent high school graduates living in the Flatbush section of Brooklyn: Presto, a cab driver; Socks, who worked in a clothing store; Figgy, a supermarket deliveryman; Joey, a plumber; and Turtle, who worked in his family's restaurant. Together they called themselves "The Fungos" as they roamed their neighborhood in search of innocent fun and excitement.

Cast
 Joseph Cali as Presto Prestopopolos
 Adrian Zmed as Socks Palermo
 Vincent Bufano as Turtle Romero
 Randy Stumpf as Joey Dee
 Sandy Helberg as Figgy Figueroa
 Antony Pinzini as Esposito
 Helen Verbit as Mrs. Fortunato

Episodes
A total of six episodes were produced, with three remaining unaired – "The Littlest Fungo", "The Wedding" and "Vooo Dooo" – because the ethnic stereotypes in the series so offended the real-life Brooklyn Borough President Howard Golden that he publicly demanded to CBS that it be canceled; it was taken off the air after only three telecasts.

References

External links

1979 American television series debuts
1979 American television series endings
1970s American sitcoms
CBS original programming
English-language television shows
Television shows set in New York City
Flatbush, Brooklyn
Brooklyn in fiction
Television shows filmed in Los Angeles
Television series by Lorimar Television